Vanamala is a 1951 Indian Malayalam-language film, directed by G. Viswanath and produced by V&C Productions. The film stars P. A. Thomas, Ammini in lead roles. The film had musical score by P. S. Divakar. It is the first jungle movie in Malayalam, also the debut film of Neyyattinkara Komalam, director G. Viswanath, lyricist P. Kunjukrishna Menon, singer Jikki and cameraman Arumugham.

Cast
 P. A. Thomas
 Ammini
 Muthukulam Raghavan Pilla
 Baby Lakshmi
 Karthikeyan Nair
 Sumathikkutty Amma
 Kamala Bhargavan
 Neyyaattinkara Komalam
 Kanchana
 Raju
 Ambalappuzha Krishnamoorthy
 Kandiyoor Parameshwaran Pillai
 SP Pillai

References

External links
 

1951 films
1950s Malayalam-language films